Sreejith may refer to:
 Sreejith Ravi, Indian film actor
 Sreejith Ramanan, Indian theatre director, actor, theatre trainer
 Sreejith Vijay, Indian film and television actor

See also 
 Srijit Mukherji, Indian Bengali film director